Hopea chinensis is a species of medium-sized tree ( tall) in the family Dipterocarpaceae. It is found in China (S and SW Guangxi, S and SE Yunnan) and northern Vietnam.

Hopea chinensis is an endangered species threatened by exploitation of its durable timber. In China it is under first-class national protection. It also produces hopeachinols C and D.

References

chinensis
Trees of China
Trees of Vietnam
Critically endangered flora of Asia
Taxonomy articles created by Polbot